Dulce María Sauri Riancho (born 1951 in Mérida, Yucatán) is a Mexican politician who was the first woman to serve as governor of Yucatán, from 1991 through 1994. She served as a congresswoman of the LXIV Legislature of the Mexican Congress, during which she was also the President of the Chamber of Deputies (equivalent to the Speaker of the House in other countries). During her tenure as governor, reforms which restructured the Henequen industry in Yucatán were implemented. The toll road between Mérida and Cancún was also built and became operational during her administration.

Dulce María Sauri studied sociology at the Universidad Iberoamericana. Between 1977 and 1982, she worked in the Federal Public Administration in various capacities: Social Programming Technical Assistance Plan (1975–1977); State of Coahuila, 
Ministry of Programming and Budget (1977–1979); Outreach Program Coordinator for Integrated Rural Development Programme (PIDER) (1979–1982) and head of Ministry of Planning and Budget Evaluation Unit for Yucatán (1979–1982).

She has been an active member of the Institutional Revolutionary Party (PRI) since 1981.  She has served as deputy in the Congress of Yucatán and as federal deputy in the lower house of the Mexican Congress (Yucatán's Fourth District, 1982–85). Between 1988 and 1991, she served as federal Senator representing Yucatán. After her tenure as governor of Yucatán (1991–1994), she returned to the lower house of the federal government between 1994 and 1996. She served as the coordinator of the National Programme for Women between 1995–2000 and simultaneously served on the National Commission for Women between 1996 and 1999. She served as the president of the Inter-American Commission of Women (CIM) of the Organization of American States from (1998–2000)

Sauri became national president of the PRI in 1999 and though lost the presidency in the 2000 election, refused to step down, remaining as party president until 2002. Sauri served in the upper house of the federal Congress from 2000 to 2006. During her tenure in the Senate, she served as Chair of the Asia Pacific Foreign Relations Committee. She was also a member of the Foreign Relations Committee, the North American Foreign Relations Committee, and the Finance and Public Credit Committee.

See also 
 Governor of Yucatán

References 

1951 births
Living people
Institutional Revolutionary Party politicians
Governors of Yucatán (state)
People from Mérida, Yucatán
Members of the Senate of the Republic (Mexico) for Yucatán
Women members of the Senate of the Republic (Mexico)
Politicians from Yucatán (state)
20th-century Mexican politicians
20th-century Mexican women politicians
21st-century Mexican politicians
21st-century Mexican women politicians
Women governors of States of Mexico
Women members of the Chamber of Deputies (Mexico)
Women legislative speakers
Deputies of the LXIV Legislature of Mexico
Universidad Iberoamericana alumni
Members of the Chamber of Deputies (Mexico) for Yucatán
Senators of the LVIII and LIX Legislatures of Mexico